Puge County is a county in the south of Sichuan Province, China. It is under the administration of the Liangshan Yi Autonomous Prefecture.

Tourist attractions
 Luojishan  Scenic Area in Luojiashan Town.

Climate

Townships 

 Caizi Township

References

 
Liangshan Yi Autonomous Prefecture
Amdo
County-level divisions of Sichuan